John Comstock may refer to:

John Henry Comstock (1849–1931), American entomologist
John Lee Comstock (1787–1858)  American surgeon and educator
John Comstock, a minor character in The Baroque Cycle novels